Fatma Sultan ("one who abstain"; 19 June 1879 – 20 November 1932) was an Ottoman princess, the daughter of Sultan Murad V and Resan Hanım.

Early life
Fatma Sultan was born on 19 June 1879, during the third year of her family's confinement in Çırağan Palace. Her father was Murad V, son of Abdulmejid I and Şevkefza Kadın. She was named after Murad's favoutite sister, Fatma Sultan. Her mother was Resan Hanım. She was the sixth child, and third daughter of her father and the eldest child of her mother. She had a sister, Aliye Sultan, one year younger than her. She was the first Murad's child born after his rise at the throne and deposition and the first born in the Çırağan Palace during his prisonery. 

According to Filizten Hanım, she was calm, dignified, serious-minded, polite, and gentle, differenti by her elder half-sisters, Hatice Sultan and Fehime Sultan. She spent an important part of her time in playing the piano and reading books in French. Unlike her half-sisters, she chose not to leave the palace to marry before her father's death, because Abdülhamid II's condition was to never see her family again. After her father, Sultan Murad's death in 1904, her ordeal in the Çırağan Palace came to an end.

Marriage
In 1907, Abdul Hamid arranged Fatma's marriage to Karacehennemzade Refik Bey who was eight years her junior, a diplomat and son of the governor and senator of Konya, Faik Bey, and grandson of Ibrahim Ağa. The marriage took place on 29 July 1907 in the Yıldız Palace. The couple was given Esma Sultan Mansion located in Ortaköy as their residence.

The marriage was happy and the two together had five children, Sultanzade Mehmed Bey, born on 1908 and died in 1911, twins Ayşe Hatice Hanımsultan and Sultanzade Mehmed Ali Bey born on 20 January 1909, Sultanzade Mehmed Murad Bey born in August 1910 and died in January 1911, and Sultanzade Celaleddin Bey born on 23 April 1916. 

In 1908, her mother Resan Hanim left the Çırağan Palace, where she had stayed to keep company to Şayan Kadın, and came to live with her.

Fatma Sultan inherited her mother’s jewel when she died in 1910 but never wore them. She lived frugally and like an ordinary citizen of Istanbul, even going out herself for the shopping. She was particularly devoted to her husband.

At the exile of the imperial family in March 1924, every person had to leave Turkey in seven days. Fatma Sultan who had measles that time was allowed to reside in Istanbul, until she recovered. She and her family left Turkey in September 1924 making them the last imperial family members to leave Istanbul. They settled in Sofia, Bulgaria.

Death
Fatma Sultan died at the age of fifty three on 23 November 1932 in Sofia, Bulgaria, and was buried there. Her husband outlived her by twenty years and died in 1952.

Honours
Order of the House of Osman
Order of Charity, 1st Class
Order of the Medjidie, 1st Class

Issue

In literature and popular culture
In the 2017 TV series Payitaht: Abdülhamid, Fatma Sultan is portrayed by Turkish actress Alara Turan.
Fatma Sultan is a character in Ayşe Osmanoğlu's historical novel The Gilded Cage on the Bosphorus (2020).

Ancestry

See also
 List of Ottoman princesses

References

Sources

 
 

1878 births
1932 deaths
Royalty from Istanbul
19th-century Ottoman princesses
20th-century Ottoman princesses